ISO 3166-2:DE is the entry for Germany in ISO 3166-2, part of the ISO 3166 standard published by the International Organization for Standardization (ISO), which defines codes for the names of the principal subdivisions (e.g., provinces or states) of all countries coded in ISO 3166-1.

Each code consists of two parts, separated by a hyphen.

Current codes 
Subdivision names are listed as shown in the ISO 3166-2 standard, published by the ISO 3166 Maintenance Agency. 

 Notes

The codes for Lower Saxony, Saxony, and Saxony-Anhalt were deliberately chosen (second or last letter of German state name as second letter in the code) because they avoid the connotations of Nazism associated with codes like NS ("Nationalsozialismus"), SA ("Sturmabteilung"), and SS ("Schutzstaffel"). The code for Hamburg could also be avoided on these grounds – it can be associated with the phrase Heil Hitler – but it is accepted as it was already in use for the city's vehicle registration plates long before Hitler's time in power.

See also 
 Administrative divisions of Germany
 FIPS region codes of Germany
 NUTS codes of Germany

External links 
 ISO Online Browsing Platform: DE
 States of Germany, Statoids.com

2:DE
States of Germany-related lists